Frontenac was a steamboat, the first paddle steamer launched on the Canadian side of the Great Lakes, in 1816.

Built in Ernesttown, Ontario, by American contractors for Kingston businessmen during 1816 at a cost of £15,000, she entered service in spring 1817.  Frontenac conducted regular runs across Lake Ontario between Kingston, York (now Toronto), and Niagara-on-the-Lake. The round trip fare between Kingston and York was $18 ($12 one way) in cabin class.

Frontenac typically generated about 50 horsepower (using the original Boulton and Watt formula), which was too little for a ship of her size, and she was often outperformed by sailing craft.  She rarely managed to make money in eight years; the provincial population was simply too small.

Frontenac was sold for £1550 to John Hamilton in 1824, who persisted two more unsuccessful years before selling her for scrap at Niagara in 1827. Before she could be scrapped, she burned to the waterline due to arson. Parts of her engines were salvaged and used later in the Alciope on Lake Ontario and Adelaide on Lake Erie.

See also
 Walk-in-the-water (steamboat) – first steamboat on Lakes Erie, Huron and Michigan

Sources 
Lewis, Walter. "Frontenac", in The Canadian Encyclopedia, Volume 2, p. 850. Edmonton: Hurtig Publishers, 1988.
Lewis, Walter, ""The Frontenac: A Reappraisal" in FreshWater, vol. 2, no. 1 (Summer 1987): 28–39 (http://www.maritimehistoryofthegreatlakes.ca/Documents/frontenac/)

Paddle steamers
Steamships of Ontario
Economic history of Canada
Ships built in Ontario
1817 ships
Steamboats of the Great Lakes